Isocossus stroehli is a moth in the family Cossidae. It is found in Malaysia and on Sumatra.

References

Natural History Museum Lepidoptera generic names catalog

Cossinae
Moths described in 2006
Moths of Asia